The  is a kofun burial mound located in the Teradani neighborhood of the city of Iwata, Shizuoka in the Tōkai region of Japan. The site was designated a National Historic Site of Japan in 1956, with the area under protection enlarged in 1979.

Overview
The Teradani Chōshizuka Kofun is located on the east bank of the Tenryū River. The tumulus is orientated south-south west and has a total length of 108 meters, making it the third largest found in Shizuoka Prefecture. The anterior rectangular portion is 52 meters wide with a height of 4.5 meters, and the posterior domed portion has a diameter of 58 meters and height of eight meters. There are traces of a surrounding ten-meter wide moat and fukiishi stones. The tumulus was excavated in 1880 and 1898 and was found to contain a vermilion-painted vertical burial chamber with a length of three meters. Grave goods] included an ancient triangular-edged Shinju-kyo Bronze mirror with a design of mythical animals, pottery and bronze artifacts, which dated the tomb to the middle to end of the 4th century AD.  

The surrounding area contains many other ancient kofun, which are not covered by the National Historic Site protection, with the exception of the Kochōzuka Kofun, a smaller "two-conjoined rectangle"-shaped tomb immediately adjacent to the Teradani Chōzuka Kofun. This tomb has a length of 54 meters, orientated east. It also has a ten-meter wide moat, which partly intersects that of the Teradani Chōzuka Kofun. This tumulus has not been excavated, and its interior details is unknown, but it is believed to predate the Teradani Chōzuka Kofun.

The site is a ten-minute walk from the  "Choshi Tsukaguchi" bus stop on the Entetsu Bus from Iwata Station on the Tōkaidō Main Line.

See also
List of Historic Sites of Japan (Shizuoka)

References

External links

Iwata city home page 

Kofun
History of Shizuoka Prefecture
Iwata, Shizuoka
Historic Sites of Japan